The 2015 Evergreen Premier League (referred to as the EPLWA) was the second season of the Evergreen Premier League. The season began on 25 April 2015.

Eight clubs participated. WestSound FC folded and Olympic Force joined the league in 2015.

Spokane Shadow won the Evergreen Premier League title.

League table

Results

Top scorers

References 

2016
Evergreen